Wayanad Chetti, or Chetti, is an unclassified Southern Dravidian language of India spoken by Wayanadan Chetti community in the Wayanad district of Kerala, India. It has 62-76% lexical similarity with Gowder, 65% with Jen Kurumba and 52% with Kannada. Kannada is the closest major language. Their language is also very similar to Badaga.

References

Dravidian languages